Sancho Garcés may refer to:

Sancho Garcés, legendary king of Sobrarbe (815–832)
Sancho Garcés I of Pamplona (r. 905–925)
Sancho Garcés II of Pamplona (r. 970–994)
Sancho Garcés III of Pamplona (r. 1004–1035)
Sancho Garcés IV of Pamplona (r. 1054–1076)
Sancho Garcés, Lord of Uncastillo (d. 1083)